The 2011 PFF National Men's Club Championship (known as the PFF–Smart Men's Club Championship for sponsorship reasons) is the 1st season of a Filipino association football competition organized by the Philippine Football Federation and sponsored by mobile phone and Internet service provider Smart Communications. It revives a national tournament discontinued since 2006. The last nationwide competition was a National Men's Open Tournament held in Bacolod under the presidency of Juan Miguel Romualdez. Plans were conceived for a similar national competition under Romualdez's successor Jose Mari Martinez but did not push through for a variety of reasons.

Global Teknika emerged the champions on August 22, 2011 after winning against San Beda F.C. on a 3-2 aggregate.

Competition format
Member Associations (MA) of the Philippine Football Federation organize their own tournaments as part of Provincial Qualifying Rounds in March 2011 to determine their representatives to the Group Stages. The Cluter Qualifying Rounds was held in a single-round robin competition from April 1–16, 2011. Each MA is only allowed one club as a representative. Clubs from the Visayas region (Cebu, Iloilo, Leyte, Negros Occidental, Negros Oriental) and the National Capital Region competed in the Regional Qualifying Rounds while waiting for the winners of the Luzon and Mindanao clusters. Top four teams from the Luzon Cluster Qualifying Round and the top team from each of the Mindanao group clusters will advance to All-Luzon and All-Mindanao Championship. The top two clubs from NCR, Luzon, Visayas, and Mindanao will advance to the finals which was played in Cagayan de Oro and Bacolod from August 9–13, 2011. The four teams that emerged from the group stage Quarterfinals were Teknika and Pachanga of National Capital Region F.A., San Beda of Football Association of Rizal, and Stallion of Iloilo Football Association. Crossover Semifinals were held on August 16–17, 2011 while the home-and-away finals was held on August 21 and 22, 2011. The Semifinals and the Finals were held at Rizal Memorial Stadium.

Qualifying round
Regional qualifying rounds were conducted in single round robin tournament. The single-round robin competition took place from April 1–16 when football associations contested  in the Cluster Qualifying Rounds where one club represented each Member Association. Clubs were allowed up to five foreign players but only four can play on the field at any given time.

National Capital Region Cluster
First and second best teams for National Capital Region Cluster earn a bye for the quarterfinals group stage. Teknika1 and Pachanga qualified for the quarterfinals group stage. At least 10 clubs from Metro Manila took part in the qualifiers.

1Global FC competed under this name due to sponsorship reasons.
Pachanga

Luzon Cluster
North, Central and South Luzon Cluster
San Beda FC of Football Association of Rizal
Baguio United FC, champions of 1st Mayor Mauricio G. Domogan Football Cup, represented Baguio City Football Association.  
Laguna Football Association
Quezon Football Association
Football Association of Tarlac

Southeast Luzon Cluster 
ABC Stars FC represented Naga City-Camarines Sur Football Association
Football Association of Masbate
Camarines Norte Football Association
Legaspi City-Albay Federated Football Association
Oriental Mindoro Football Association

Visayas Cluster
First and second best teams for Visayas Cluster earn a bye for the quarterfinals group stage. 
Stallion FC of Iloilo Football Association
Laos FC of Leyte Football Association
Cebu Football Association
Negros Occidental Football Association
DCCCO FC, winner of 1st Silliman Cup, represented Negros Oriental FA.

Mindanao Cluster
Mindanao was split into four sub-clusters: North, South, Central and West Mindanao Cluster.

North Mindanao Cluster
Ba-o Breakers FC represented Iligan – Lanao del Norte Football Association
Montecarlo FC
Diego Silang FC
Bukidnon Football Association 
Surigao del Norte Football Association

South Mindanao Cluster
Medvil FC
PNP FC
Compostela Valley Football Association
Agusan del Sur Football Association
Columbia FC, winner of Ebocci-Davao Premier League, represented Davao Football Association.

Central Mindanao Cluster
Real Marbel FC represented Football Association of South Cotabato
Maguindanao-Cotabato City Football Association 
North Cotabato Football Association 
Sultan Kudarat Football Association

West Mindanao Cluster
Bric-A-Brac FC represented Zamboanga del Sur - Pagadian Football Association
Alia FC
Stonefield FC
DMC FC

Regional Championship

All-Luzon Championship

All-Mindanao Championship

Quarterfinals
Group A was held in Pelaez Sports Complex, Cagayan de Oro hosted by Cagayan de Oro-Misamis Oriental Football Association (CMOFA). Group A participants were Bao Breakers FC of Iligan, Laos FC of Leyte, San Beda FC of Rizal, and Teknika FC. Group B was held in Barotac Nuevo, Iloilo. Group B participants were Stallion FC, Columbia FC of Davao, Pachanga FC of NCR and Baguio United. The group stage matches were held from August 9–13, 2011.

Group A

Group B

Knockout stage

Semifinals

Finals

Teknika wins 3–2 on aggregate

References

PFF National Men's Club Championship seasons
2011 in Philippine football